1977 ACC tournament may refer to:

 1977 ACC men's basketball tournament
 1977 Atlantic Coast Conference baseball tournament